Rik de Voest and Ashley Fisher were the defending champions, but only de Voest tried to defend his title.
He partnered with Frederik Nielsen. However, they lost to Andis Juška and Dmitri Sitak in the quarterfinal.
Juška and Sitak won this tournament, by defeating Lee Hsin-han and Yang Tsung-hua 3–6, 6–3, [10–2] in the final.

Seeds

Draw

Draw

References
 Doubles Draw

Flea Market Cup - Doubles